Will Matthews (born 30 March 1988) is an Australian former professional rugby league footballer.

He played for the Gold Coast Titans and the St. George Illawarra Dragons in the National Rugby League. Matthews was briefly contracted to the Widnes Vikings in the Super League.

Background
Matthews was born in Kyogle, New South Wales, Australia.

He played his junior football for Kyogle Turkeys while attending Palm Beach Currumbin State High School, before being signed by the Gold Coast Titans.

Playing career
He played for the Tweed Heads Seagulls in the Queensland Cup in 2007 and the Titans' Toyota Cup team in 2008. In round 16 of the 2008 NRL season he made his NRL debut for the Titans against the St. George Illawarra Dragons. In June 2008, Matthews re-signed with the Titans for three years.

On 5 July 2011, Matthews signed a two-year contract with the St. George Illawarra Dragons starting in 2012.  Matthews was limited to only five appearances in the 2011 NRL season as the Gold Coast finished last and claimed the wooden spoon.  The Gold Coast had the chance to avoid finishing last but lost their final match of the season against Parramatta.

He made his debut for St. George in round 21 of the 2012 NRL season.  On 5 September 2013, Matthews re-signed with St. George on a one-year contract.

On 24 October 2014, Matthews again re-signed with St. George on a one-year contract.  On 19 June 2015, Matthews re-signed with St. George on a two-year contract.  On 8 December 2017, Matthews signed a train and trial contract with NRL club the Gold Coast Titans.  Matthews was released by Widnes earlier in the year on compassionate grounds.

At the end of the 2019 NRL season, it was announced that Matthews was retiring from rugby league.

Representative career
Matthews played for the Australian Schoolboys team in 2006.

References

External links
Gold Coast Titans profile
St. George Illawarra Dragons profile
Matthews a tough young Titan
Australian Secondary Schools Rugby League

1988 births
Australian rugby league players
Gold Coast Titans players
Rugby league second-rows
St. George Illawarra Dragons players
Illawarra Cutters players
Rugby league locks
Tweed Heads Seagulls players
Rugby league props
Living people
Kyogle Turkeys players
Rugby league players from New South Wales